The Bølling–Allerød interstadial, also called the Late Glacial Interstadial, was an abrupt warm and moist interstadial period that occurred during the final stages of the Last Glacial Period. This warm period ran from 14,690 to 12,890 years before the present (BP). It began with the end of the cold period known as the Oldest Dryas, and ended abruptly with the onset of the Younger Dryas, a cold period that reduced temperatures back to near-glacial levels within a decade.

In some regions, a cold period known as the Older Dryas can be detected in the middle of the Bølling–Allerød interstadial. In these regions the period is divided into the Bølling oscillation, which peaked around 14,500 BP, and the Allerød oscillation, which peaked closer to 13,000 BP.

Estimates of  rise are 20–35 ppmv within 200 years, a rate less than 29–50% compared to the anthropogenic global warming signal from the past 50 years, and with a radiative forcing of 0.59–0.75 W m−2. A previously unidentified contributor to atmospheric  was the expansion of Antarctic Intermediate Water, which is poor at sequestering the gas.

History

In 1901, Danish geologists Nikolaj Hartz (1867–1937) and Vilhelm Milthers (1865–1962) provided evidence for climatic warming during the last glacial period, sourced from a clay-pit near Allerød (Denmark).

Effects
It has been postulated that teleconnections, oceanic and atmospheric processes, on different timescales, connect both hemispheres during abrupt climate change.

The Meltwater pulse 1A event coincides with or closely follows the abrupt onset of the Bølling–Allerød (BA), when global sea level rose about 16 m during this event at rates of 26–53 mm/yr.

Records obtained from the Gulf of Alaska show abrupt sea-surface warming of about 3 °C (in less than 90 years), matching ice-core records that register this transition as occurring within decades.

Scientists from the Center for Arctic Gas Hydrate (CAGE), Environment and Climate at the University of Tromsø, published a study in June 2017, describing over a hundred ocean sediment craters, some 3,000 meters wide and up to 300 meters deep, formed due to explosive eruptions, attributed to destabilizing methane hydrates, following ice-sheet retreat during the last glacial period, around 12,000 years ago, a few centuries after the Bølling–Allerød warming. These areas around the Barents Sea still seep methane today, and still-existing bulges with methane reservoirs could eventually have the same fate.

Ice-sheet retreat

Isostatic rebound in response to glacier retreat (unloading), increase in local salinity (i.e., δ18Osw), have been attributed to increased volcanic activity at the onset of Bølling–Allerød, are associated with the interval of intense volcanic activity, hinting at an interaction between climate and volcanism – enhanced short-term melting of glaciers, possibly via albedo changes from particle fallout on glacier surfaces.

The second Weichselian Icelandic ice sheet collapse, onshore (est. net wastage 221 Gt a−1 over 750 years), similar to today's Greenland rates of mass loss, has been attributed to atmospheric Bølling–Allerød warming. Furthermore, the study authors noted:

Flora 
Ice uncovered large parts of north Europe and temperate forests covered Europe from N 29° to 41° latitude. Pioneer vegetation, such as Salix polaris and Dryas octopetala, began to grow in regions that were previously too cold to support these plants. Later, mixed evergreen and deciduous forests prevailed in Eurasia, more deciduous toward the south, just as today. Birch, aspen, spruce, pine, larch and juniper were to be found extensively, mixed with Quercus and Corylus. Poaceae was to be found in more open regions.

Fauna 
During this time late Pleistocene animals spread northward from refugia in the three peninsulas, Iberian Peninsula, Italy and the Balkans. Geneticists can identify the general location by studying degrees of consanguinity in the modern animals of Europe. Many animal species were able to move into regions far more northerly than they could have survived in during the preceding colder periods.  Reindeer, horse, saiga, antelope, bison, woolly mammoth and woolly rhinoceros were attested, and were hunted by early man. In the alpine regions ibex and chamois were hunted. Throughout the forest were red deer. Smaller animals, such as fox, wolf, hare and squirrel also appear. Salmon was fished. When this interstadial period ended, with the onset of the Younger Dryas, many of these species were forced to migrate south or become regionally extinct.

Causes
In recent years research tied the Bølling–Allerød warming to the release of heat from warm waters originating from the deep North Atlantic Ocean, possibly triggered by a strengthening of the Atlantic meridional overturning circulation (AMOC) at the time.

Study results which would help to explain the abruptness of the Bølling–Allerød warming, based on observations and simulations, found that 3°–5 °C Ocean warming occurred at intermediate depths in the North Atlantic over several millennia during Heinrich stadial 1 (HS1). The authors postulated that this warm salty water (WSW) layer, situated beneath the colder surface freshwater in the North Atlantic, generated ocean convective available potential energy (OCAPE) over decades at the end of HS1. According to fluid modelling, at one point the accumulation of OCAPE was released abruptly (c. 1 month) into kinetic energy of thermobaric cabbeling convection (TCC), resulting in the warmer salty waters getting to the surface and subsequently warming of c. 2 °C sea surface warming.

Human cultures
Humans reentered the forests of Europe in search of big game, which they were beginning to hunt relentlessly, many to extinction. Their cultures were the last of the Late Upper Palaeolithic. Magdalenian hunters moved up the Loire into the Paris Basin. In the drainage basin of the Dordogne, the Perigordian prevailed. The Epigravettian dominated Italy. In the north, the Hamburgian and Federmesser cultures are found. The Lyngby, Bromme, Ahrensburg and Swiderian were also attested in Europe at this time. To the south and far east the Neolithic had already begun. In the Middle East, the pre-agricultural Natufian settled around the Eastern Mediterranean coast to exploit wild cereals, such as emmer and two-row barley. In the Allerød they would begin to domesticate these plants.

See also 
 Abrupt climate change
 African humid period
 Antarctic Cold Reversal
 Dansgaard–Oeschger event
 Hiawatha Glacier
 Ice age

Sources

External links 
Sensitivity and rapidity of vegetational response to abrupt climate change
Climate change clues revealed by ice sheet collapse

History of climate variability and change
Nordic Stone Age
Pleistocene events
Historical eras
Natufian culture